Ballo Chak  is a village in Bhulath tehsil in Kapurthala district of Punjab state, India. The village is administrated by a Sarpanch who is an elected representative.

Population data

Nearby cities 
Bhulath
Kapurthala
Phagwara
Sultanpur Lodhi

Air travel connectivity 
The closest International airport to the village is Sri Guru Ram Dass Jee International Airport.

References

External links
 Villages in Kapurthala
 List of Villages in Kapurthala Tehsil

Villages in Kapurthala district